is a Japanese animated television series, consisting of 26 episodes. The plot and characters were created by Yoshikazu Yasuhiko, and it was directed by Rintaro and first broadcast on TBS between 3 October 1975 and 26 March 1976. The name was changed to Kum-Kum after the sixth episode.

It was adapted as a manga in December 1975, written and illustrated by Takemaru Nagata, and serialized in Kodansha's Terebi Magajin (TV Magazine) under the name "Kum-Kum." A four-panel comic strip adaptation of the series also appeared periodically in Mainichi Shimbun in Osaka.

The series explored the adventures of Kum-Kum, a naughty boy in primeval times, and his friends as they grow up, often playing antics that surprise the occasional visitor to their village, and which almost always end up with Kum-Kum being grounded by his stern father, Paru Paru.

Characters 
Kum-Kum (voiced by Kazue Tagami) is the main character, a naughty and kind boy.
Chiru-Chiru (voiced by Teruko Akiyama), Kum-Kum's girlfriend, whose father is deceased.
Aaron (voiced by Yoshiko Ota) one of Kum-Kum's faithful friends. 
Mochi-Mochi (voiced by Kōko Kagawa), Kum-Kum's shy friend.
Furu-Furu (voiced by Yōko Asagami) is Kum-Kum's teenage sister.
Paru-Paru (voiced by Kōsei Tomita), Kum-Kum's grumpy dad.
Maru-Maru (voiced by Mitsuko Tobome) is Kum-Kum's sweet mom.
Toru-Toru (voiced by Sachiko Chijimatsu) is Kum-Kum's baby brother.
Klopedia (voiced by Ryūji Saikachi) is the wise elder of the village, who lives surrounded by stone books.
Roman (voiced by Ryūsei Nakao) the son of Klopedia who eventually marries Furu-Furu.

In popular culture
Argentine football player Sergio Agüero's nickname, "Kun", comes from the name of the show.

References

External links
 Kum Kum Maniac
 
 

1975 anime television series debuts
Sunrise (company)
Fictional prehistoric characters
TBS Television (Japan) original programming